Yamana may refer to:

 Yamana, Astrakhan Oblast, Russia
 Yamana clan, a Japanese clan
 Yamana Gold, a Canadian-based gold mining company operating in South and Central America
 Yahgan people in Chile and Argentina
 Yahgan language